Antonio D'Antoni (25 June 1801 – 18 August 1859) was an Italian opera composer and conductor.

Life and career
D'Antoni was born in Palermo to a musical family and gained local fame when in 1813, at the age of 12, he conducted his own composition, a Mass for St. Cecilia's Day. By 1817, he had become the city's maestro concertatore (music director). A friend of Meyerbeer, Bellini, and Donizetti, D'Antoni worked in England, Frankfurt, Venice, and Florence before settling in Trieste. In 1828, he became the music director of Trieste's newly formed Società Filarmonico-Drammatica (Philharmonic and Dramatic Society). Amongst the works he composed for the Society were a cantata, Il genio di Trieste (The Spirit of Trieste) and a comédie en vaudeville, La festa dell'archibugio (The Arquebus Festival).

He composed four operas, the first of which, Un duello (A Duel), premiered at the Teatro Carolino in Palermo in 1817. His last opera, Giovanna Grey (based on the life of Lady Jane Grey) was to be performed at the Teatro Grande in Trieste but was cancelled because of the Revolutions of 1848. He also composed various pieces of church music, marches, dances, and songs.

D'Antoni committed suicide in Trieste in 1859.

Operas
Un duello, premiered 1817 at the Teatro Carolino, Palermo
Amina, premiered 1835 at the Teatro Comunale, Trieste
Amazilda e Zamoro, premiered 1826 at the Teatro della Pergola, Florence
Giovanna Grey, composed 1848 (unperformed)

References

1801 births
1859 deaths
Italian classical composers
Italian male classical composers
Italian conductors (music)
Italian male conductors (music)
Italian opera composers
Male opera composers
Musicians from Palermo
19th-century classical composers
19th-century conductors (music)
19th-century Italian composers
Suicides in Italy
1850s suicides